This is a list of name changes of Yangon's major thoroughfares following

Roads

Places 

Yangon-related lists
Yangon